Chlamydonella is a genus of marine ciliates found in the seas around Antarctica.

References

Ciliate genera